Simpsonichthys nielseni is a species of killifish from the family Rivulidae.
It is found in the São Francisco River basin in Brazil in South America.

References

nielseni
Fish of the São Francisco River basin
Taxa named by Wilson José Eduardo Moreira da Costa
Fish described in 2005